The World Group was the highest level of Davis Cup competition in 2012. The first round losers went into the Davis Cup World Group Play-offs and the winners progress to the quarterfinals. The quarterfinalists were guaranteed a World Group spot for 2013.

The competition was won by the Czech Republic who defeated Spain in the final.

Participating teams

Seeds

Draw

First round

Spain vs. Kazakhstan

Austria vs. Russia

Canada vs. France

Switzerland vs. United States

Czech Republic vs. Italy

Serbia vs. Sweden

Japan vs. Croatia

Germany vs. Argentina

Quarterfinals

Spain vs. Austria

France vs. United States

Czech Republic vs. Serbia

Argentina vs. Croatia

Semifinals

Spain vs. United States

Argentina vs. Czech Republic

Final

Czech Republic vs. Spain

References

World Group
Davis Cup World Group